VC2 may refer to:

 Valkyria Chronicles II, a 2010 tactical role-playing game by Sega for the PlayStation Portable, sequel to Valkyria Chronicles
 Second Vatican Council or Vatican II, 1962–1965, addressed relations between the Roman Catholic Church and the modern world
 Virtua Cop 2, a light gun arcade game by Sega released in 1995
 VideoCipher 2, a television receive-only (TVRO) scrambling system publicly launched 1986, phased out 1991 to 2014
 VC-2, secondary aircraft for carrying the President of Brazil within South America, see Brazilian Air Force One#Secondary aircraft (VC-2)
 VC-2, a video compression format, see Dirac-Pro video codec
 VC2, a candidate phylum of bacteria